Anders Grøndal (born 4 March 1984) is a Norwegian rally and hill climb driver. His co-driver is Trond Svendsen.

He has so far won:
5 Norwegian championship gold, 3 Norwegian championship silver, 2 Norwegian championship bronze

Anders Grøndal is the third generation rally driver in his family. He grew up with motorsport. His grandfather Nils Fredrik Grøndal and father Stein Grøndal were active rally and rally cross drivers. His uncle Knut Fredrik Grøndal was also a Norwegian hill climb champion.

2002
In 2002 Anders and the team visited former works driver John Hauglands Rally School to see what the level was in which they could compete. After doing several test and John Haugland recognizing the potential Anders has, the team decided to buy a Subaru Impreza STi and aim to reach to top of Group N within 3 years, starting in the 2003 season.

2003
The first year of rally for Bilbutikken WRT (Subaru jr Team) with a Subaru Impreza STi built by Rune Dalsjø Rally Team. Henning Elvekrok was the team's first co-driver. Anders and Henning won their first Group N victory in Rally Sørland 2003. During the season Subaru Norway already had Morten Østberg in WRC as their senior team and wanted a young team in their Gr.N Subaru. Henning Elvekrok was therefore replaced with younger co-driver Trond Inge Østbye in the middle of the season. Anders took his first championship points in Aurskog Høland Rally 2003.
The team ended the season third in the Subaru Cup.

2004
For the 2004 season Bilbutikken WRT (Subaru jr team in 2004) bought their first brand new Subaru Rally car from Prodrive. The N9 car proved to be much quicker than the Norwegian build 2001 car the team used in 2003. Anders and Trond Inge won their first overall victory in a non-championship rally called Eidskogsprinten. They also achieved their first fastest stage time in a championship round. 
In 2004 Anders and Trond Inge also did their first WRC round in Sweden.

2005
In 2005 the team got the Subaru Impreza N11 2005 Group N car. It was the first N11 to be built and the car therefore experienced a lot of problems, so the team had to fall back to the N9 car in the beginning of the season. During the season the problems with the N11 car were fixed and Anders achieved his goal of winning a championship round in three 3 years when he won the 2005 Rally Hedemarken. In 2005 they also competed in a few hill climb races achieving a silver medal in the championship.

2006
The team got the Subaru Impreza WRC 2004 SWRT that Petter Solberg used in Monte Carlo and Swedish rally 2005 (WT53 SRT) the car was re-registered to KF81149 when it got to Norway. The team had the best start to the season with overall win in the first Norwegian rally championship round in Mountain Rally. This was Anders and Trond Inge's first overall win in the Norwegian championship! The next event was the trial event for WRC Rally Norway. A third place overall in the rally was a good result for the team. The team was in the fight for the title for most of the season, but the young team was to eager and crashed in the final rallies and ended at a disappointing 5th overall.

2007
The 2007 season gave the team 10 total victories. And a podium finish in every other rally they finished. Overall in the Norwegian championship Anders ended up third behind Mads Østberg and Thomas Schie.
This was the first year Anders did the full hill climb season. It was a great season where Anders set hill records in all but one hill. Here he won its first Norwegian championship gold medal.
This was the last year Trond Inge Østbye was co-driving for the team. He was replaced mid-season by earlier Norwegian champion for co-drivers Ragnar Engen and X jr world champion Jonas Anderson.

2008
In the 2008 season Anders crashed his Subaru Impreza WRC in a hill climb rally. The team therefore had to borrow a car from another driver, that car failed with an engine problem in Aurskog, ending all hopes for a championship title.

2009
Anders wasn't very lucky in the 2009 rally season, in the first rally they had to retire on the second stage after a miscommunication with the co-driver. At the second rally the first teams on the track were challenged by a snow blizzard, slowing them down. The 2009 rally season was ended with a 4th position overall.  In the hill climb competition the team had more luck and won all races and ended with the golden medal. Another good victory was the golden medal in the WRC tarmac cup.

2010

A good season for Anders when looking at the results: Norwegian champion in Rally and Hill climb, driving 4 PWRC rounds and winning the PWRC stage on tarmac in France.
On a personal level Anders was less lucky when he broke his back during the rally of Stavanger, after he recovered he was 1.5 cm shorter!
This was the worst crash in Anders rally career.

2011
Again a great hill climb season, Norwegian champion hill climb winning all events, won all the heats in every event for third year in a row and is unbeaten in 46 heats in a row. 
Silver in the Norwegian Rally championship, won three events (Sigdalsrally, Rally Hadeland and Aurskog Høland.
Leading PWRC events for the first time in Sweden and Portugal. Won 8 out of 11 stages in Sweden before retired with engine fail.

Career results

WRC results

* Season still in progress.

PWRC results

WRC-2 results

* Season still in progress.

External links
Profile at eWRC-results.com
Official website 

Norwegian rally drivers
World Rally Championship drivers
Living people
1984 births